The Little Para River is a seasonal creek running across the Adelaide Plains in the Australian state of South Australia, whose catchment fills reservoirs that supply some of the water needs of Adelaide’s northern suburbs.

Course and features
It runs from its source near Lower Hermitage in the Mount Lofty Ranges, flows north westerly to the Little Para Reservoir and then westerly to the Barker Inlet via Swan Creek and into Gulf St Vincent at Globe Derby Park . The lower portion of the river is badly affected by human activity and stormwater runoff but the upper reaches have a good range of biodiversity. The river descends  over its  course.

As the river flows down from the Adelaide Hills over the Para fault escarpment, it has formed a large alluvial fan on which Salisbury is built. The river is narrow and winding, formerly flooded in heavy rain and rarely reaches its sea outlet. Over time the river has been widened and levees added to reduce this flooding. In the 19th century lack of consistent flow in the river and the absence of an organised water supply system led to the digging of wells. The Little Para Reservoir is built in the path of the river for water storage and flood mitigation. As the river's catchment is insufficient to fill the reservoir, it is mainly used to store water pumped from the River Murray. Periodically water is released from the reservoir into the river, enabling refreshing of ground water.

Etymology
The river’s name is based directly on the Kaurna word pari which means river.

History
In 1838 John Barton Hack shared with Colonel George Gawler and a Mr Williams in a  "Special Survey" nearby at £1 per acre. Hack established a dairy there and transported butter south to the city.

The river attracted John Harvey to form his settlement at Salisbury in 1847 and was crucial to the development of the citrus industry from 1852. Orange groves and lemon and almond trees were spread along the banks; several of the growers' residences are still in existience. In the 1960s the City of Salisbury began acquiring land for public space, and a belt of parklands with biking and walking trails now borders the river.

See also

References

Further reading 
 

Little Para
Adelaide Plains